Brinje is a municipality in Lika-Senj County, Croatia, located about 35 miles from Gospić. 
The town is formed around a castle called Sokolac, which contains one of the most well preserved Gothic chapels in Croatia, St. Marys, which dates back to the 14th century. The Sokolac Castle in the town is named after the Croatian word for falcon (sokol), which appears on the town's coat of arms.

History

Brinje's history dates back to medieval times, while the town was held by the noble Frankopan and Gorjanski families. Brinje was important medieval fortified city held by Frenkopan family.

In the late 19th century and early 20th century, Brinje was part of the Lika-Krbava County of the Kingdom of Croatia-Slavonia.

It is some 60 km north of Gospić, on once important road, the "Josephina", passing from the hinterland through the Kapela pass towards the coast in Senj. The new highway that is  built brought much needed prosperity to Brinje.

Villages

According to 2001 census, Brinje had 4,108 inhabitants, out of which 92% were Croats. The municipality is one of several in the Lika region where Čakavian dialect is spoken.

 Brinje - 1,708
 Glibodol - 41
 Jezerane - 375
 Križ Kamenica - 286
 Križpolje - 655
 Letinac - 222
 Lipice - 254
 Prokike - 122
 Rapain Klanac - 10
 Stajnica - 301
 Vodoteč - 98
 Žuta Lokva - 37

Notable natives and residents
 Josif Rajačić
 Franjo Brozinčević
 Davor Lasić

References

Bibliography

External links

 Brinje

Municipalities of Croatia
Populated places in Lika-Senj County